Chionanthus leopoldii grows as a tree up to  tall, with a trunk diameter of up to . The bark is greyish. The flowers are pale greenish. C. leopoldii is endemic to Borneo.

References

leopoldii
Endemic flora of Borneo
Trees of Borneo
Plants described in 2002